is a private university in Suginami, Tokyo, Japan, established in 1950. The predecessor of the school was founded in 1903.

This university is called "Edo University of Commerce" in Gregory S. Poole's book The Japanese Professor: An Ethnography of a University Faculty (Sense Publishers, 2010. ).

External links
 Official website 

Educational institutions established in 1903
Private universities and colleges in Japan
Universities and colleges in Tokyo
Western Metropolitan Area University Association
1903 establishments in Japan